A Woman Alone, also released as Two Who Dared, is a 1936 British drama film directed by Eugene Frenke and starring Anna Sten, Henry Wilcoxon and Viola Keats.

Plot
An officer becomes entangled in a love affair with a woman who works as a maid.

Cast
 Anna Sten - Maria
 Henry Wilcoxon - Capt. Nicolai Ilyinski
 Viola Keats - Olga Ilyinski
 John Garrick - Yakov Sharialev
 Romilly Lunge - Lt. Tuzenback
 Esme Percy - General Petroff
 Francis L. Sullivan - Prosecutor
 Guy Middleton - Alioshka
 Peter Gawthorne - President of Court Martial
 Frank Atkinson - Porter
 Minnie Rayner - Lousha
 Pat Noonan - Sergeant

References

External links
 

1936 films
1936 drama films
British drama films
British black-and-white films
Films shot at Imperial Studios, Elstree
1930s English-language films
Films directed by Eugene Frenke
1930s British films